Büelwiesen is a quarter in the district 3 of Winterthur.

It was part of Seen municipality until amalgamation into Winterthur in 1922.

References

Winterthur